Quayside Tower is a modern commercial building in Birmingham, England. It is situated on Broad Street, one of Birmingham's busiest streets. It forms a prominent part of the Broad Street skyline which consists of many other highrise buildings.

Originally built in 1965 to a design by John Madin, it was refurbished in 2003 to a design by Richard Johnson & Associates to give it a more fashionable appearance. Ashford Construction stripped all sixteen floors above the podium and added a new curtain walling from the top downwards. This produced a new roof feature which was designed by Watts & Partners. A new reception area was constructed and the 240 space car park was refurbished. It was developed by Kenmore Group.

Attached to the podium are a series of up to 20 abstract concrete reliefs by William Mitchell which were commissioned by John Madin in 1965.

The GI for this building was record setting by a prominent West London broker.

See also
 List of tallest buildings and structures in the Birmingham Metropolitan Area, West Midlands

References

External links
 Emporis entry
 Skyscrapernews entry

Buildings and structures in Birmingham, West Midlands